The Ice Hockey Association of India (IHAI) is the governing body of ice hockey in India. It became a member of the International Ice Hockey Federation (IIHF) on April 27, 1989. However, as of 2014 no teams from India participate in IIHF world championships. The current President of the Association is Dr. Surinder Mohan Bali.

In addition to working with other sport organisations in India such as the Indian Olympic Association and the Sports Authority of India to develop hockery infrastructure and construct rinks, the IHAI is seeking corporate sponsors. In April 2015, the players started a crowdfunding campaign on BitGiving to take part in an international tournament. The hashtag #SupportIceHockey trended nationwide. In response to the campaign the team also received its first corporate sponsorship deal, with the Mahindra Group. The group's head, Anand Mahindra, tweeted that he had "decided to support these passionate athletes".

Many of the members of the Indian national team, coordinated by the IHAI, are recruited from clubs associated with military units and regiments. The IHAI has however created programs to introduce the sport to a wider audience, for example through the Learn to Play programs that have been implemented in Ladakh and Kargil and soon will be in Delhi and Mumbai. As an alternative for players interested in the sport but who due to climate do not have access to outdoor ice rinks, the association will begin holding programs in in-line hockey as well. This will build on existing in-line hockey being played informally in Gujarat and Mumbai.

In 2015, the Ice Hockey Association of India sent the men's national team to Canada to play a game against the ECHL's Brampton Beast. On the team's trip through Canada in October 2015 the team will also play the CWHL's Calgary Inferno, according to Adam Sherlip, the only coach Team India has ever had.

The Ice Hockey Association of India is responsible for overseeing all ice hockey in India.

National teams

Men's
 India men's national ice hockey team
 India men's national junior ice hockey team
 India men's national under-18 ice hockey team

Women's
 India women's national ice hockey team
 India women's national junior ice hockey team
 India women's national under-18 ice hockey team

Competitions
Indian Ice Hockey Championship

References

External links
India at IIHF.com

India
Ice hockey in India
India
Sports governing bodies in India
1989 establishments in India
Sports organizations established in 1989 
Sport in India
Winter sports in India